Wiconisco may refer to the following in the U.S. state of Pennsylvania:

Wiconisco Canal, in Dauphin County
Wiconisco Creek, a tributary of the Susquehanna River
Wiconisco Township, Dauphin County, Pennsylvania